Banksia gardneri var. gardneri is a variety of Banksia gardneri. As an autonym, it is defined as encompassing the type material of the species. It is native to the Southwest Botanical Province of Western Australia.

Use in horticulture
Banksia gardneri gardneri is a slow growing shrub though fairly  easy to grow. It is less vigorous than Banksia blechnifolia or B. petiolaris. Seeds do not require any treatment, and take 19 to 64 days to germinate.

References

 

gardneri var. gardneri
Eudicots of Western Australia